Joseph Higgins (1838 – 16 September 1915) was an Irish-born Catholic bishop in Australia. He was the Bishop of Rockhampton in Queensland and the Bishop of Ballarat in Victoria.

Early life 
Joseph Higgins was born in 1838 in Westmeath, Ireland. He was educated at St Finian's Seminary, Navan.

Religious life 
Higgins attended St Patrick's College, Maynooth where he was ordained in 1863. He served as President of St. Finnian's in Navan from 1867 until 1884 before becoming parish priest in Castletown.

On 4 May 1899 he was appointed Bishop of Rockhampton, where he completed the cathedral, built 19 churches and established 10 schools, 8 institutions for lay women, and 2 communities of nuns.

In May 1904 he suffered a "slight" paralytic stroke.

On 3 March 1905, aged 67 years, he became the Bishop of Ballarat, succeeding Dr James Moore.

Later life 
Higgins died at the Bishop's Palace at Ballarat on 16 September 1915, having been ill with bronchial and heart troubles for some months prior.

References 

Roman Catholic bishops of Rockhampton
Roman Catholic bishops of Ballarat
1838 births
1915 deaths
Alumni of St Patrick's College, Maynooth
People educated at St Finian's College